Notable dinosaur specimens can individually increase science's knowledge about the life and world of the dinosaurs.

By history
 List of lost, damaged, or destroyed dinosaur specimens
List of dinosaur specimens sold at auction

By preservation
 List of dinosaur specimens with documented taphonomic histories
 List of pathological dinosaur specimens
 List of dinosaur specimens preserved with agonistic and feeding traces
 List of dinosaur specimens with preserved soft tissue

By taxonomic significance

By taxon
 Specimens of Archaeopteryx
 Specimens of Tyrannosaurus

Type specimens
 List of marginocephalian type specimens
 List of ornithopod type specimens
 List of sauropodomorph type specimens
 List of Mesozoic theropod type specimens
 List of thyreophoran type specimens

In popular culture
 List of nicknamed dinosaur specimens